Oyako Islands are two small islands, one very tiny, lying immediately north of Cape Akarui on the coast of Queen Maud Land. Mapped from surveys and air photos by Japanese Antarctic Research Expedition (JARE), 1957–62, and named Oyako-shima (parent and child islands).

See also 
 List of antarctic and sub-antarctic islands

Islands of Queen Maud Land
Prince Olav Coast